Sagittario (F 565) is the second ship of the s of the Italian Navy. She was sold to Peruvian Navy in the 2000s. Quiñones (FM-58) is one of eight Carvajal-class frigates of the Peruvian Navy. It is named after José Quiñones Gonzales, a Peruvian pilot who was a hero of the Ecuadorian–Peruvian War who sacrificed himself to destroy an enemy position.

Construction and career

Italian service

The ship initially built for the Italian Navy and was named Sagittario with a pennant of F 565. The ship was laid down on 4 February 1976, was launched on 22 June 1977 by the shipyard Riva Trigoso and commissioned in the Italian Navy on 18 November 1977.

On 31 October 2005 Sagittario was decommissioned and transferred to the Navy of Peru.

Peruvian service

The Peruvian flag first flew over the ship on 23 January 2006 in La Spezia, Italy while it was being outfitted for Peruvian usage.

For its commissioning process, Quiñones sailed from the port of La Spezia in the Mediterranean Sea, across the Atlantic Ocean and into the Pacific Ocean via the Panama Canal, and south to its base in Callao where it arrived on 22 January 2007.

The ship has often performed in multi-national military exercises beside the United States Navy and other regional partners.

References

External links
 Sagittario (F 565) Marina Militare website

Carvajal-class frigates
1977 ships
Ships built by Fincantieri
Ships built in Italy